Davide Carrus (born March 19, 1979) is an Italian retired footballer who played as a midfielder.

References

External links

1979 births
Living people
Italian footballers
Cagliari Calcio players
S.P.A.L. players
Modena F.C. players
A.C. Ancona players
ACF Fiorentina players
S.S.C. Bari players
Bologna F.C. 1909 players
Empoli F.C. players
Frosinone Calcio players
Casertana F.C. players
A.S. Pro Piacenza 1919 players
Serie B players
Serie C players
Serie D players
Association football defenders
Footballers from Sardinia